The Somali Custodial Corps is the section of the Police force that is responsible for the maintenance and guarding of prisons and is a military provost due to the Corps investigating crimes within the Somali Armed Forces and bringing individuals before the Military Courts. Although the Custodial Corps is part of the Police, they have these powers as the Police was integrated into the military from 1960 to the turn of the 21st century, where since then the government has separated the military from the Police but the Corps still retains the same powers and responsibilities it had since 1960. Its function is quite similar to that of the Italian Arma dei Carabinieri but the Custodial Corps fall under the Ministry of the Interior and are part of the Police Force. The founding commander was Ismail Ahmed Ismail.

History 
In 1884 the British formed an armed constabulary to police the Somaliland coast. In 1910 the British created the Somaliland Coastal Police, and in 1912 they established the Somaliland Camel Corps to police the interior.

In 1926 the colonial authorities formed the Somaliland Police Force. Commanded by British officers, the force included Somalis in its lower ranks. Armed rural constabulary supported this force by bringing offenders to court, guarding prisoners, patrolling townships, and accompanying nomadic tribesmen over grazing areas.

In 1960, the British Somaliland Somaliland Scouts joined with the (Police Corps of Somalia) (1910–1960) to form a new Somali Custodial Corps, which consisted of about a few hundred men. The authorities also organized approximately 1,000 of the force as the Daraawishta Booliska, a mobile group used to keep peace between warring clans in the interior. As the Police Force acted as a civil police force, the Custodial Corps fulfilled roles that would be more in-line with military police forces. The government considered the SCC a part of the armed forces until 1991, after which the Asluubta would be put under the Ministry of Interior instead of the Armed Forces.

Mission and Duties 

 Operating Prisons
 Transferring suspects
 Conducting investigations of military crimes
 Policing the Armed Forces
 Public Safety

Equipment 
The Corps's uniform appears more similar to that of the military due to its khaki colour, but the Corps uses green berets, ties and accent on rank insignia (the Army uses red accents), the Corps also utilises dark green fatigues in the south of the country, the Corps's inventory is similar to that of the military due to the embargo preventing the government from obtaining more arms.

See also

References 

Law enforcement in Somalia